Lemon balm (Melissa officinalis) is a perennial herbaceous plant in the mint family and native to south-central Europe, the Mediterranean Basin, Iran, and Central Asia, but now naturalised elsewhere.

The leaves have a mild lemon scent. During summer, small white flowers full of nectar appear. It is not to be confused with bee balm (genus Monarda), although the white flowers attract bees, hence the genus Melissa (Greek for "honey bee").

The leaves are used as a herb, in teas and also as a flavouring. The plant is used to attract bees for honey production. It is grown as an ornamental plant and for its oil (to use in perfumery).  Lemon balm has been cultivated at least since the 16th century.

Description

Lemon balm (Melissa officinalis) is a perennial herbaceous plant in the mint family Lamiaceae, and native to south-central Europe, the Mediterranean Basin, Iran, and Central Asia, but now naturalized in the Americas and elsewhere. The second name, officinalis (Latin, 'of the shop'), originates from the use of the herb by apothecaries, who sold herbal remedies directly to their customers.

They are soft and hairy with scalloped edges, and have a mild lemon scent. During summer, small white or pale pink flowers appear. The plants live for ten years; the crop plant is replaced after five years to allow the ground to rejuvenate.

Historical uses
The use of lemon balm can be dated to over 2000 years ago through the Greeks and the Romans. It is mentioned by the Greek polymath Theophrastus in his Historia Plantarum, written in 300 BC, as "honey-leaf" (μελισσόφυλλον). Lemon balm was formally introduced into Europe in the 7th century, from which its use and domestication spread. Its use in the Middle Ages is noted by herbalists, writers, philosophers, and scientists.

Lemon balm was a favourite plant of the Tudors, who scattered the leaves across their floors. It was in the herbal garden of the English botanist John Gerard in the 1590s, who considered it especially good for feeding and attracting honeybees. Especially cultivated for honey production, according to the authors Janet Dampney and Elizabeth Pomeroy, "bees were thought never to leave a garden in which it was grown". It was introduced to North America by the first colonists from Europe; it was cultivated in the Gardens of Monticello, designed by the American statesman Thomas Jefferson.

The English botanist Nicholas Culpeper considered lemon balm to be ruled by the planet Jupiter in Cancer, and suggested it to be used for "weak stomachs", to cause the heart to become "merry", to help digestion, to open "obstructions of the brain", and to expel "melancholy vapors" from the heart and arteries.

In traditional Austrian medicine, M. officinalis leaves have been prescribed as a herbal tea, or as an external application in the form of an essential oil.

Current uses
Lemon balm is the main ingredient of carmelite water, which is sold in German pharmacies.

The plant is grown and sold as an ornamental plant, and for attracting bees. The essential oil is used as a perfume ingredient. It is used in toothpastes.

Lemon balm is used as a flavouring in ice cream and herbal teas, often in combination with other herbs such as spearmint. The leaves are not dried when used for tea. It is a common addition to peppermint tea, mostly because of its complementing flavor. Lemon balm is also used with fruit dishes or candies. It can be used in fish dishes and is the main ingredient in lemon balm pesto. Its flavour comes from geraniol (3–40%), neral (3–35%), geranial (4–85%) (both isomers of citral), (E)-caryophyllene (0–14%), and citronellal (1–44%). It is also one of the ingredients in Spreewald gherkins.

Cultivation

Melissa officinalis is native to Europe, central Asia and Iran, but is now naturalized around the world. It grows easily from seed, preferring rich, moist soil.

The plant grows in clumps and spreads vegetatively (a new plant can grow from a fragment of the parent plant), as well as by seed. In mild temperate zones, the plant stems die off at the start of the winter, but shoot up again in spring. Lemon balm grows vigorously.

, Hungary, Egypt, and Italy are the major producing countries of lemon balm. The leaves are harvested by hand in June and August in the northern hemisphere, on a day when the weather is dry, to prevent the crop from turning black if damp.

The cultivars of M. officinalis include:
 M. officinalis 'Citronella'
 M. officinalis 'Lemonella'
 M. officinalis 'Quedlinburger'
 M. officinalis 'Lime'
 M. officinalis 'Mandarina'
 M. officinalis 'Variegata'
 M. officinalis 'Aurea'
 M. officinalis 'Quedlinburger Niederliegende', an improved variety bred for high essential oil content.

Essential oil production
Ireland is a major producer of lemon balm essential oil, which has a pale yellow colour and a lemon scent. The essential oil is commonly co-distilled with lemon oil, citronella oil or other essential oils. Yields are low; 0.014% for fresh leaves and 0.112% for dried leaves.

Chemistry
Lemon balm contains eugenol, tannins, and terpenes.

Notes

References

Further reading
 
 
 
 
 
 
 
 
 
 
 
 
 

Lamiaceae
Herbs
Flora of Europe
Flora of Asia
Flora of North Africa
Plants described in 1753
Taxa named by Carl Linnaeus
Flora without expected TNC conservation status